Ridgemont High School may refer to: 

Ridgemont High School (Ohio), in Ridgeway, Ohio, United States
Ridgemont High School (Ottawa), in Ottawa, Ontario, Canada